Ravi Agrawal is a Hindi film producer, entrepreneur, and a book publisher. He produced films Deadline: Sirf 24 Ghante, Fever, Radio – Love on Air, Handover, and others.

Apart from producing Hindi films, he has also produced a few films in Marathi, web-series, etc. His productions in Marathi include Akalpit, Salaam – The Salute and Mahasatta. Salaam – The Salute and Mahasatta have won many awards.

Background

Born on 20 August 1962, Ravi Agrawal had deep interest in theatre since his college days. He directed several plays and dramas while studying. After completing his education he chose cinema as his career. He soon realised that a producer is a key person in the making of a quality film. Since 2004, he has been involved in the production of films, with his own share of success.

He also runs a publishing division 'Plus Ink', to encourage film literature; whose 1st published book 'I, Romantic', has received good reviews.

Career 
Ravi Agrawal is a well-known producer in Bollywood. Ravi Agrawal was born on 20 August 1962 in Mumbai. From childhood, he had an interest in film. He watched many movies, so he decided to make a career in the film industry.

He has completed his education in Lala Lajpatrai College of Commerce and Economics, Mumbai. During his college days, he participated in many plays and dramas. He also worked as the director in those plays and dramas. His passion and hard work helped him to produce short films.

The quality of his short films facilitated his entry into Bollywood. Producing the short films has helped him to explore his calibre and increase his contacts.

He produced his first film in 2006. The first film was Deadline: Sirf 24 Ghante, a box office hit. Another movie was Radio: Love On Air was released in 2009. In this movie, Himesh Reshammiya was the lead actor.

The movies Handover and Fever were released in 2011 and 2016, respectively.

As Book Publisher
Ravi Agrawal is also known as an entrepreneur and book publisher. The name of his publishing firm is "Ravi Agrawal, Plus Ink". He has started his publishing division to help improve the film literature. He helped Rajeev Jhaveri who was the director of Fever (a movie produced by Ravi Agrawal) and writer to publish his first book, 'I, Romantic'. This book was related to a love story beyond romance and love. The book was first published on 28 April 2010. It was one of the best-selling books in India. Today I, Romantic novel is been published worldwide.

Filmography

Since 2004, Mr. Agrawal's production banner Plus Entertainment Pvt. Ltd. has produced nine films in Hindi and Marathi.

Marathi movies 
Three Marathi films, Akalpit, Salaam – The Salute and Mahasatta, all directed by award-winning director, Ramesh Laxman More have been appreciated.

Akalpit, released in 2004, starring Avinash Narkar, Aishwarya Narkar, Pushkar Shrotri, Aditi Sarangdhar and Arun Nalawade, dealt with the bold themes of wife-swapping and extra-marital affairs.

Salaam – The Salute, released in 2005, featuring Meghan Jadhav in his debut child artist role, was the first to receive numerous awards and nominations.

Mahasatta, a political drama revolving around worker unions, released in 2008, starring Arun Nalavade, Avinash Narkar, Milind Shinde, Ashwini Ekbote, Jyoti Subhash was a critically acclaimed film and was the official Indian entry at the following film festivals:
 International Film Festival of India (2008) in the Indian Panorama competition section
 Bengaluru International Film Festival (2009)
 International Film Festival of Kerala (2009)
Awards & Nominations:

Hindi movies 
Mr. Agrawal's venture into Hindi cinema, Deadline: Sirf 24 Ghante, was a thriller film, starring Irrfan Khan, Konkona Sen Sharma, Rajit Kapur, Sandhya Mridul and Zakir Hussain, released in November 2006. This was followed by:
 Radio: Love on Air (2009) – Starring Himesh Reshammiya, Shenaz Treasury, Sonal Sehgal, Paresh Rawal, Zakir Hussain and Rajesh Khattar. It won the "Best Lyrics" category at Stardust Awards 2010.
 Sale Upto 50% – Starring Vinod Sehrawat, Gita Soto, Urvashi Yadav, Zakir Hussain and Lekh Tandon.
 Handover (2011) – Starring Vikas Kumar, Prabhat Raghunandan and Nutan Sinha. It won critical appreciation.
 Benaras 1918: A love story (2013) – Starring Om Puri, Yashpal Sharma, Virendra Saxena, Reshmi Ghosh, and Upasana Singh
 Fever (2016) – Starring Rajeev Khandelwal, Ayesha Takia, Caterina Mourino, Gemma Atkinson and Victor Banerjee.

Short films 
Ravi Agrawal has also produced the short films which offer social message to the society. Ravi Agrawal is one of the finest in this work. He has produced two short films which are given below.

References

Hindi film producers
Film producers from Mumbai
Living people
1962 births